The 1995–96 Indiana Hoosiers men's basketball team represented Indiana University. Their head coach was Bobby Knight, who was in his 25th year. The team played its home games in  Assembly Hall in Bloomington, Indiana, and was a member of the Big Ten Conference.

The Hoosiers finished the regular season with an overall record of 20–11 and a conference record of 13–5, finishing 2nd in the Big Ten Conference. The Hoosiers were invited to participate in the 1996 NCAA tournament. However, IU made a quick exit with a loss in the first round to Boston College.

Roster

Schedule/Results

|-
!colspan=8| Regular Season
|-

|-
!colspan=8| NCAA tournament

Notes

^Jan 16: Purdue forfeited this game, thus IU's official record is 20–11 (13–5).

References

Indiana Hoosiers men's basketball seasons
Indiana
Indiana
1995 in sports in Indiana
1996 in sports in Indiana